Major General Harry Clay Hale (July 10, 1861 – March 21, 1946) was a United States Army officer in the late 19th and early 20th centuries. He served in several conflicts, including World War I, and received the Army Distinguished Service Medal.

Military career
Henry Clay Hale was born on July 10, 1861, in Knoxville, Illinois, as the son of T. Judson Hale and Sarah Payne Pierce. Destined for a military career, he entered the United States Military Academy (USMA) as the youngest member of his class in July 1879 and graduated from there almost four years later in June 1883. Among his classmates included several future general officers, such as George Windle Read, Chase Wilmot Kennedy, Omar Bundy, George H. Cameron, Samson L. Faison, Lawrence Tyson, Charles Gould Morton, Tyree R. Rivers, George Windle Read, John Wilkinson Heard, Ira Allen Haynes, William Campbell Langfitt, John Wilson Ruckman, Robert D. Walsh, Isaac Littell and Clarence Ransom Edwards.

Hale was originally commissioned in the 12th Infantry Regiment and was stationed at Fort Niagara. He and his regiment went to Fort Bennett in 1886, and he participated in the Sioux Wars while there. He was recommended for the Medal of Honor, though he ultimately did not receive it. Hale was in charge of Sioux prisoners in 1891, and he served as an aide to Wesley Merritt from 1893 to 1899, meaning he served in the Philippines during the Spanish–American War. He also served as an aide to Arthur MacArthur Jr. Hale commanded the 44th Volunteer infantry during the Philippine–American War, and he commanded Bilibid Prison in 1902. He also served as the acting commander of the 20th Infantry Regiment during the Battle of Luzon.

After serving on the General Staff in Washington, D.C., from 1903 to 1906, Hale returned to the Philippines for another three years. In 1910 and 1911, he was the Adjutant-General of the Department of the Lakes and the Department of the Missouri. Hale commanded the 17th Infantry Regiment along the border with Mexico in 1914, and he commanded the 20th Infantry Regiment in 1915. Also in 1915, Hale was sent to China to command the 15th Infantry Regiment, though he returned to the United States shortly afterward in order to organize the 84th Division at Camp Zachary Taylorl after the American entry into World War I. After going to France in late 1917 as a combat observer, Hale returned to the United States and took the 84th Division to France the following year but it did not see combat. Walter Krueger, who would later rise to prominence during World War II, served for a while with the 84th Division as its chief of staff.

Hale was promoted to the rank of major general on August 5, 1917, shortly after his promotion to brigadier general, and he received the Army Distinguished Service Medal for his command of the 84th Division. The citation for the medal reads:

After the Armistice with Germany which brought the war to an end, Hale assumed command of the 26th Division and brought it back to the United States from France. After this, he then commanded the 1st Division and then was the commanding general of the Sixth Corps Area in Chicago. Hale received an LL.D. from Knox College in 1923, and he retired from the army, after more than forty years of service, in 1925.

Hale lived in Palo Alto, California, or Rockville, Maryland, during his retirement, and he died on March 21, 1946, at the age of 84. He was buried at Arlington National Cemetery.

Personal life
Hale married Elizabeth C. Smith on December 2, 1886. They had no children.

References

Bibliography

External links

|-

|-

|-

1861 births
1946 deaths
United States Army Infantry Branch personnel
People from Knoxville, Illinois
People from Palo Alto, California
People from Rockville, Maryland
American military personnel of the Spanish–American War
United States Army generals of World War I
Recipients of the Distinguished Service Medal (US Army)
United States Military Academy alumni
Burials at Arlington National Cemetery
United States Army generals
Naval War College alumni
American military personnel of the Philippine–American War
Military personnel from California
Military personnel from Illinois